Hitchita is a town in McIntosh County, Oklahoma, United States. The Encyclopedia of Oklahoma History and Culture says that the town was named for a band of Muskhogean Indians that had been absorbed into the Creek tribe. The population was 88 at the 2010 census, a decline of 22.1 percent from 113 in 2000.

Geography

Hitchita is southeast of Okmulgee, northeast of Henryetta, and directly north of Oklahoma’s largest lake, Lake Eufaula.

Demographics

As of the census of 2000, there were 113 people, 44 households, and 31 families residing in the town. There were 51 housing units at an average density of 429.2 per square mile (164.1/km2). The racial makeup of the town was 82.30% White, 0.88% African American, 9.73% Native American, and 7.08% from two or more races.

There were 44 households, out of which 27.3% had children under the age of 18 living with them, 63.6% were married couples living together, 4.5% had a female householder with no husband present, and 27.3% were non-families. 25.0% of all households were made up of individuals, and 15.9% had someone living alone who was 65 years of age or older. The average household size was 2.57 and the average family size was 3.09.

In the town, the population was spread out, with 21.2% under the age of 18, 8.8% from 18 to 24, 25.7% from 25 to 44, 22.1% from 45 to 64, and 22.1% who were 65 years of age or older. The median age was 42 years. For every 100 females, there were 88.3 males. For every 100 females age 18 and over, there were 93.5 males.

The median income for a household in the town was $20,536, and the median income for a family was $22,321. Males had a median income of $18,750 versus $12,500 for females. The per capita income for the town was $11,695. There were 14.3% of families and 22.6% of the population living below the poverty line, including 38.9% of under eighteens and 12.1% of those over 64.

Notable person
Actor Will Sampson (1933 - 1987) is buried in the Graves Creek Indian Cemetery north of town.

References

External links
 Oklahoma Historical Society - Hitchita

Towns in McIntosh County, Oklahoma
Towns in Oklahoma